Remainder theorem may refer to:
Polynomial remainder theorem
Chinese remainder theorem